This is a list of notable film, stage and television actors from Hungary.

Although listed in Western-, native names follow the Eastern name order.

For an alphabetical list of articles on Hungarian actors see :Category:Hungarian actors.

A 
 Gábor Agárdy
 Andor Ajtay
 Péter Andorai
 Imre Antal
 Nimród Antal

B 
 András Bálint
 Ágnes Bánfalvy
 Ferenc Bessenyei
 Gizi Bajor
 Anna Báró
 Gyula Bartos
 Gyula Benkő
 Gyula Bodrogi
 Alexandra Borbély
 György Bárdy
 Ildikó Bánsági
 István Bujtor
 Imre Bajor
 Juli Básti
 József Bihari
 Kati Berek
 Lajos Balázsovits
 Ilona Béres
 Margit Bara
 Samu Balázs

C 
 Eszter Csákányi
 Gyula Csortos
 György Cserhalmi
 Ágnes Csomor
 Sándor Csányi
 Teréz Csillag

D 
 Alfréd Deésy
 Iván Darvas
 Kata Dobó

E 
 Enikő Eszenyi
 Gábor Egressy
 Sandor Elès
 Károly Eperjes

F 
 Iván Fenyő
 Sári Fedák

G 
 Dezső Garas
 Gyula Gózon
 Hilda Gobbi
 János Gálvölgyi
 János Görbe
 László Gálffi
 Miklós Gábor
 Márton Garas
 Nóra Görbe
 Zita Görög
 Antos Gémes

H 
 Frigyes Hollósi
 Gábor Harsányi
 Géza Hofi
 Eszter Hollosi
 Hanna Honthy
 Judit Hernádi

J 
 Jenő Janovics
 Joli Jászai
 Zsombor Jéger
 Juci Komlós
 Pál Jávor

K 
 Flóra Kádár
 Iván Kamarás
 András Kern
 Attila Kaszás
 Ferenc Kállai
 Gyula Kabos
 Manyi Kiss
 Gábor Koncz
 Katalin Karády
 Róbert Koltai

L 
 Ila Lóth
 Kálmán Latabár
 Róza Laborfalvi
 Zoltán Latinovits

M 
 Gábor Mádi Szabó
 József Madaras
 Károly Makk
 László Márkus
 Margit Makay
 Mária Mezei
 Tamás Major
 Attila Mokos
 Tibor Molnár
 Zoltán Makláry
 Ági Mészáros
 Tamas Menyhart

O 
 Lajos Őze

P 
 Antal Páger
 Ilka Pálmay
 Irma Patkós
 Sándor Pécsi
 Kornélia Prielle

R 
 Gábor Reviczky
 Kálmán Rózsahegyi
 Éva Ruttkai

S 
 Catherine Schell
 Roland Selmeczi
 László Sinkó
 Imre Sinkovits
 Artúr Somlay
 Imre Soós
 András Stohl
 Gyula Szabó
 Sándor Szabó
 Ádám Szirtes
 Eva Szorenyi

T 
 Elemér Thury
 Géza Tordy
 Klári Tolnay
 Mari Törőcsik

U 
 Dorottya Udvaros
 Tivadar Uray

V 
 Ilus Vay
 Miklós Vig
 Vera Venczel

Z 
 Ferenc Zenthe
 Zoltán Zubornyák

See also 
 Lists of actors

 
Lists of actors by nationality
Actors